The 2017–18 Derde Divisie season is the second edition of the new Dutch fourth tier, formerly called Topklasse, since the restructuring of the league system in the summer of 2016.

Teams

Saturday league

Sunday league

League tables

Saturday league

Sunday league

Promotion/relegation play-offs Tweede and Derde Divisie 
The numbers 15 and 16 from the 2017–18 Tweede Divisie and 3 (substitute) period winners of each of the 2017–18 Derde Divisie's, making a total of 8 teams, decide in a 2-round knockout system which 2 teams will play next season in the 2018–19 Tweede Divisie. The remaining 6 teams will play next season in the 2018–19 Derde Divisie.

Qualified Teams

Results 

Jong Almere City and Scheveningen promoted to the 2018–19 Tweede Divisie.
Lisse and TEC relegated to the 2018–19 Derde Divisie.
The other teams remain in the 2018–19 Derde Divisie.

First round

Match A

Match B

Match C

Match D

Final round

Match E

Match F

Promotion/relegation play-offs Derde Divisie and Hoofdklasse 

The numbers 15 and 16 from the 2017–18 Derde Divisie Saturday league and 3 (substitute) period winners of each of the two 2017–18 Hoofdklasse Saturday leagues, making a total of 8 teams, decide in a 2-round knockout system which 2 teams play next season in the 2018–19 Derde Divisie Saturday league. The remaining 6 teams play next season in the 2018–19 Hoofdklasse Saturday leagues.

The same applies for the 2017–18 Derde Divisie Sunday league and each of the two 2017–18 Hoofdklasse Sunday leagues.

See Promotion/relegation play-offs Derde Divisie and Hoofdklasse on the Hoofdklasse page

References 

Derde Divisie seasons
4
Ned